Melaleuca rugulosa, commonly known as scarlet bottlebrush, is a plant in the myrtle family, Myrtaceae and is endemic to South Australia and Victoria in Australia. (Some Australian state herbaria continue to use the name Callistemon rugulosus. Callistemon coccineus and Callistemon macropunctatus are older names for Callistemon rugulosus.) It is a shrub with an open straggly habit, stiff, sharply pointed leaves and bright red bottlebrush flowers tipped with yellow in summer.

Description
There is a mid-vein, marginal veins and 7–13 indistinct lateral veins. The young leaves and branches are often covered with dense, silky hairs.

The flowers are a shade of red to purple, tipped with yellow and are arranged in spikes around the branches that continue to grow after flowering.

Taxonomy and naming
Melaleuca rugulosa was first named in 2006 by Lyndley Craven in Novon when Callistemon rugulosus was transferred to the present genus. It was first formally described in 1822 as Metrosideros rugulosa by Johann Heinrich Friedrich Link in Enumeratio Plantarum Horti Regii Berolinensis Altera. The specific epithet (rugulosa) is from the Latin word ruga meaning "crease" or "wrinkle" but the reason for this naming is unclear.

Callistemon rugulosus is regarded as a synonym of Melaleuca rugulosa by the Royal Botanic Gardens, Kew.

Distribution and habitat
This melaleuca occurs from the south east corner of South Australia including the Eyre Peninsula to western Victoria. It is found in mallee scrubs and low open woodland in the northern Grampians, the Big Desert, the Little Desert, and the Mount Lofty Ranges. Within these areas it is found in sandy depressions and near watercourses in soils that are seasonally moist. It grows in shrubland and forest near swamps and watercourses.

References

rugulosa
Flora of South Australia
Flora of Victoria (Australia)
Plants described in 1822